A list of American films released in 1986.

Platoon won the Academy Award for Best Picture.



Highest-grossing films
The highest-grossing American films released in 1986, by domestic box office gross revenue, are as follows:

A

B-G

H-M

N-S

T-Z

See also
 1986 in American television
 1986 in the United States

References

External links

 
 List of 1986 box office number-one films in the United States

1986
Films
Lists of 1986 films by country or language